Eisfeld station is a railway station in Eisfeld, Thuringia, Germany.

References

Railway stations in Thuringia
Buildings and structures in Hildburghausen (district)
Railway stations in Germany opened in 1858